Harald Nilsen (born February 9, 1955) is a Norwegian sprint canoer who competed in the mid-1970s. At the 1976 Summer Olympics in Montreal, he was eliminated in the semifinals of the K-1 500 m event.

References
Sports-reference.com profile

1955 births
Canoeists at the 1976 Summer Olympics
Living people
Norwegian male canoeists
Olympic canoeists of Norway